The 1964 Soviet Chess Championship was the 32nd edition of USSR Chess Championship. Held from 25 December 1964 to 27 January 1965 in Kiev. The tournament was won by Viktor Korchnoi. The final were preceded by semifinals events at Kishinev and Minsk.

Table and results

References 

USSR Chess Championships
Championship
Chess
1964 in chess
Chess